Sergio Apostol (born January 17, 1935) is a Filipino politician who served as a Philippine representative in the Leyte's 2nd district from 1992 to 2001 and again from 2010 to 2016.

Biography
Apostol, a Roman Catholic, graduated from the Ateneo Law School and was a member of the Ateneo Law Journal. He passed the Philippine Bar exams in 1958, finishing 7th. He was the City Fiscal for Quezon City, Regional Trial Court Judge, Philippine Congressman for the 2nd District of Leyte, chairman and CEO of PNOC and Cabinet Secretary.

In 2008, Sergio Apostol was Chief Presidential Legal Counsel for Philippine President Gloria Macapagal Arroyo. On October 8, 2008, Eduardo Ermita confirmed Apostol's resignation, effective October 30, to prepare for his candidacy, for Leyte congressional seat, in the 2010 Philippine general election. Apostol is a member of the board of Union Bank and the legal consultant of the SSS’ Social Security Commission (SSC).  After winning his district's seat as a Lakas-CMD party candidate of Arroyo, Apostol switched allegiance to the Liberal party of Benigno Aquino, the winner of the 2010 Presidential election.

Controversy

As Arroyo's Presidential Legal Counsel, Apostol engineered the pardon of Joseph "Erap" Estrada.  The Gloria Macapagal Arroyo government thought of an amnesty for Estrada in hope of "reconciling with the opposition" and "unifying the country."

References

External links

|-

|-

1935 births
Living people
People from Catbalogan
Liberal Party (Philippines) politicians
Members of the House of Representatives of the Philippines from Leyte (province)
20th-century Filipino judges
Ateneo de Manila University alumni
Arroyo administration personnel
Majority leaders of the House of Representatives of the Philippines
Deputy Speakers of the House of Representatives of the Philippines
Recipients of the Presidential Medal of Merit (Philippines)